Michelle Bos-Lun is an American educator, activist, and politician. She is a state representative in the Windham-4 district of Vermont.

Career 
Bos-Lun moved to Vermont in 2003 to go to graduate school at the School for International Training. For five years, she worked at Youth Services in the area of youth housing and career development. Bos-Lun then went to work at the Brattleboro Community Justice Center to help people who were recently released from prison. Bos-Lun currently serves as vice president of the board of directors of Health Care and Rehabilitation Services.

State House of Representatives Campaign 
In May 2020, Bos-Lun attended Emerge VT, a program that trains Democratic women to run for office in Vermont. On May 13, 2020, Bos-Lun declared her candidacy for the state House of Representatives seat vacated in the two-seat Windham-4 district by outgoing representative Nader Hashim. On July 11, outgoing state representative Nader Hashim endorsed Bos-Lun and incumbent state representative Mike Mrowicki. On August 11, Bos-Lun came in second in the Democratic primary, which was enough to win the Democratic nomination in the two-seat district. She beat Matt Ingram, Robert DePino, and David Ramos. The other Democratic nominee was Mike Mrowicki. On November 3, Bos-Lun and Mrowicki won the general election with no on-ballot opposition.

Electoral history

References 

Year of birth missing (living people)
Women state legislators in Vermont
Democratic Party members of the Vermont House of Representatives
21st-century American politicians
21st-century American women politicians
Living people